Sergey Tarasov (born 5 September 1988 in St. Petersburg) is a Russian snowboarder, specializing in the halfpipe.

Tarasov competed at the 2014 Winter Olympics for Russia. He placed 
36th in the qualifying round of the halfpipe, not advancing.

As of September 2014, his best showing at the World Championships is 17th, in the 2009 big air event.

Tarasov made his World Cup debut in January 2005. As of September 2014, his best finish is 8th, in a pair of halfpipe events. His best overall finish is 19th, in 2011–12.

References

1988 births
Living people
Olympic snowboarders of Russia
Snowboarders at the 2014 Winter Olympics
Sportspeople from Saint Petersburg
Russian male snowboarders
21st-century Russian people